Cherbaniani Reef, also known as Beleapani Reef, is a coral atoll belonging to the Amindivi Subgroup of islands of the Union Territory of Lakshadweep, India.

Geography
Cherbaniani Reef is located 33 km north of Byramgore Reef and at  it is the northwesternmost feature of Lakshadweep.
The 14 km long coral reef that encloses the lagoon has three small uninhabited islands on it.

Ecology
They are composed of accumulated coral sand, shingle, cuttle-bones and sea shells. There are many land hermit crabs under the boulders and among the detritus. The atoll used to be a breeding ground for pelagic birds, including the sooty tern (Sterna fuliginosa) and brown noddy (Anous stolidus), which were formerly found in great numbers.

Demographics
North Islet has a small mosque built and maintained by local fishermen from Bitra, Chetlat, Kiltan and Agatti islands. The fishermen came here and camp for fishing in a seasonal manner during the period between both monsoons.

Economics
Lakshadweep islanders from Chetlat and Bitra sometimes visit the islands to collect guano for the gardens of the inhabited islands, gathering eggs, dumping garbage and disturbing the nestlings of pelagic birds in the process. The beaches are strewn with marine litter composed mainly of oceanic flotsam deposited by currents, such as plastic bottles, glass bulbs, polystyrene foam and cans.

Administration
The Atoll belongs to the township of Bitra of Aminidivi Tehsil.

Image gallery

References

External links

Hydrographic Description (Indian Ocean Pilot)
Lagoon sizes
Cherbaniani Reef - Geographical information
Seamount Catalog - Cherbaniani Reef Seamount
List of Atolls
Sources towards a history of the Laccadive Islands
An ornithological expedition to the Lakshadweep archipelago

Landforms of Lakshadweep
Atolls of India
Islands of Lakshadweep
Important Bird Areas of Lakshadweep
Islands of India
Uninhabited islands of India